Legislative elections were held in France on 4 and 18 October 1885. Following the deaths of Napoléon, Prince Imperial and the Comte de Chambord, the monarchists and Bonapartists formed a conservative electoral alliance under the leadership of the Baron de Mackau. In the first round of the election, the conservatives won 176 seats, whereas the Opportunist Republicans - partly because radical and moderate Republicans ran against each other, underestimating the danger from the right - only won 127. However, in the second round the radical and moderate Republicans agreed that the worse-placed Republican candidates would withdraw, and Republicans won 244 seats to the conservatives' 25, leading to a Republican victory.

Henri Brisson remained prime minister immediately after the election, but resigned in December following his defeat in the presidential election to the incumbent, Jules Grévy. Brisson was replaced by Charles de Freycinet.

Results

References

Legislative elections in France
France
Legislative
France